Lantshane Phalane (born 21 November 1989) is a South African professional soccer player who plays as a midfielder for Royal AM in the South African Premier Soccer League.

References

Living people
1989 births
Association football midfielders
People from Lepelle-Nkumpi Local Municipality
Soccer players from Limpopo
South African soccer players
Baroka F.C. players
Platinum Stars F.C. players
Milano United F.C. players
University of Pretoria F.C. players
Moroka Swallows F.C. players
Bloemfontein Celtic F.C. players
Royal AM F.C. players
South African Premier Division players
National First Division players